The Premier League Riders Championship was a contest between the top riders (or two riders) with the highest average points total from each club competing in the Premier League in the United Kingdom. The championship was inaugurated in 1995, the same year that the Premier League was formed. For its first two years, the Premier League was the top league in Britain. From 1997 it was the second tier after the Elite League was formed. 

The competition was replaced by the SGB Championship Riders' Individual Championship in 2017.

Winners

See also
List of United Kingdom Speedway League Riders' champions
Speedway in the United Kingdom

References

Speedway competitions in the United Kingdom